Allani, also known under the Akkadian name Allatu (or Allatum) was the Hurrian goddess of the underworld, incorporated into Hittite and Mesopotamian pantheons as well.

Name and epithets
The name Allani is derived from a Hurrian word meaning "lady." Giving gods simple epithet-like names like Allani or Shaushka ("the great") was common in Hurrian culture.

In 1980 Wilfred G. Lambert proposed that Allatum, who he understood as the same deity as Ereshkigal in origin, was in origin the feminine counterpart, and possibly wife, of the minor Sumerian underworld god Alla. Alla was worshiped in Esagi, a settlement whose location remains unknown, and he is also attested as the sukkal (attendant deity) of Ningishzida. However, Gernot Wilhelm already noted in 1989 that no convincing Akkadian etymology has been proposed for the name Allatum, and it is now agreed that it was a derivative of Allani.

In Emar, an ancient city in Syria, both the spellings Allani and Allatu were used.

Allani was sometimes called "the bolt of the earth." Another common epithet was šiduri, "young woman." The latter was also applied to Ishara.

Worship
According to Gernot Wilhelm, based on known sources Allani was worshiped chiefly in the western Hurrian areas. Alfonso Archi describes her as one of the goddesses "of great importance in the cult" alongside Ishara and Shaushka.

It is uncertain which city was associated with Allani: documents from the Ur III period seemingly connect her with Zimudar located in the Diyala area, but in Hittite sources she is instead associated with Ḫaššum, possibly to be identified with Ḫašuanu from the Ebla texts. Theophoric names invoking her were common chiefly in the Tur Abdin area located in the southeast of modern Turkey.

During the hišuwa festival from Kizzuwatna, meant to guarantee good fortune for the royal couple, she was worshiped alongside "Teshub Manuzi," Lelluri,  Ishara, two Nupatik gods (pibithi - "of Pibid(a)" and zalmathi - "of Zalman(a)/Zalmat") and Maliya. Instructions for this celebration state the statue of Ishara is to be covered with a red draped garment, while that of Allani with an identical blue one.

In Hurrian offering lists from Ugarit Allani usually appears between Ishara and Hutena-Hutellura. Worship of Hurrian deities was still extant in the thirteenth century BCE in this city, and at times Ugaritic deities like El and Anat were incorporated into Hurrian ceremonies.

King Ḫattušili I mentions her under the name Allatum as one of the deities whose statues he brought to Hatti as war booty, alongside the  storm god of Aleppo, Lelluri, and the mountain gods Adalur and Amaruk.

Mesopotamian reception
The worship of Allatum is attested in documents from the Ur III period, especially offering lists connected to Shulgi-simti, one of the wives of king Shulgi. Other foreign deities worshiped during this period in Ur include Belet Dalatim, Belet-Šuḫnir, Belet-Terraban, Haburitum, Shaushka, Dagan, Ishara and Shuwala.

At least one temple dedicated to her, most likely located in Ur, is attested in documents from the Ur III period. One source mentions the staff of temples of Allatum, Annunitum and Shuwala. Administrative documents from Drehem detailing the amount of sacrifices made to various deities mention Allatum alongside both foreign and Mesopotamian deities. There is also evidence that she received offerings during rites held in honor of deceased kings of Ur.

In the Old Babylonian period Allatum was worshiped in Nippur.

One Babylonian divination manual explaining how to interpret the signs on the carcass of a bird sacrifice identified one possible location as the position of Allatum. It also mentions other deities of western origin, such as Ishara.

Association with other deities
Like two other of the most commonly worshiped Hurrian goddesses, Ishara and Shaushka, Allani was regarded as unmarried. A single text mentions a "daughter of Allatum," according to Volkert Haas the only reference to this goddess having children. Piotr Taracha identifies the daughter in mention as Hebat, but according to Lluis Feliu, it is possible Hebat's mother was Shalash.

Allani was often invoked alongside Ishara (originally an Ishtar-like goddess from Ebla), who also had a connection to the underworld in Hurrian religion. This association is already present in documents from the Ur III period. Veneration of them as a pair was an example of a broader phenomenon frequently attested in Hurrian sources, the worship of pairs of deities with similar purposes as de facto unity. Other examples include Shaushka's attendants Ninatta and Kulitta, the fate goddesses Hutena and Hutellura, Hebat and her son Sarruma, and the astral deities  Pinikir and DINGIR.GE6, so-called Goddess of the Night. 

Another Hurrian goddess connected to the underworld who sometimes appears in the proximity of Allani in known texts is Shuwala, though she was more commonly associated with Nabarbi. Edward Lipiński proposes that Shuwala is the same deity as Allani, which is erroneous, as they appear together as two distinct deities in texts from Ur and Hattusa.

Allani's name was written logographically as dEREŠ.KI.GAL. In Mesopotamia  they were eventually equated with each other, and in the god list An = Anum Allatum is simply an epithet of Ereshkigal. 

Hittites associated Allani with their own underworld goddess, the Sun goddess of the Earth, originally possibly a chthonic aspect of the Hattian sun goddess.  In Kizzuwatna, Allani/Sun goddess of the Earth presided over ritual purification and was believed to keep evil and impurity sealed in her kingdom. Despite the equation, Allani did not acquire the characteristics of a solar deity. 

Under her Mesopotamian name Allatum Allani was separately syncretised with another Hittite death deity, Lelwani, originally a male god from the Hattian pantheon, who started to be viewed as a goddess due to this equation. Female Lelwani is already attested in sources dated to the reign of Hittite king Hattusili III. The deity's name was written logographically as dALLATUM. 

dALLATUM and dEREŠ.KI.GAL may occur in the same texts separately from each other, indicating that Allani and Lelwani were not directly regarded as the same.

It is possible that in Ugarit Arsay, one of the daughters of the weather god Baal, was viewed as the equivalent of Allatum. Because of this association it has been proposed that she shared her character as an underworld deity. However, Steve A. Wiggins notes that it is important to maintain caution when attempting to define the roles of poorly attested Ugaritic deities entirely based on the character of their presumed equivalents.

Mythology
According to Hurrian texts, Allani resided in a palace at the gate of the "Dark Earth" (Hurrian: timri eže), the land of the dead.

In one episode from a longer mythical composition titled Song of Release (KBo 32.13) the weather god Teshub descends to the underworld and partakes in a banquet held by Allani alongside his enemies, the "former gods" whose defeat is described in the cycle of Kumarbi. The rest of the narrative is missing and both its conclusion and purpose are uncertain. Multiple explanations were proposed by experts. Walter Burkert and Erich Neu assume that Allani presided over reconciliation between Teshub and his enemies. Volkert Haas suggests that the underworld banquet should be understood as an episode comparable to the Mesopotamian myth of Inanna's descent to the netherworld, with Teshub temporarily imprisoned in the land of the dead. Gernot Wilhelm proposes that Teshub's descent to the underworld was meant to ease his anger with the treatment of his human followers by the elders of Ebla, described in other fragments of the same text, though he also considers it possible that the myth reflected rituals in which a deceased person was supposed to enter the underworld and meet their ancestors in the underworld. Mary R. Bachvarova assumes that the meeting with Allani is related to the fact that the humans Teshub is concerned with in other sections of the myth are meant to care for funerary rites.

References

Bibliography

Hurrian deities
Underworld goddesses
Mesopotamian goddesses
Hittite deities
Ugaritic deities